USS Naos (AK-105) was a  commissioned by the US Navy for service in World War II. Naos was named after the star Naos, in the constellation Puppis. She was responsible for delivering troops, goods and equipment to locations in the Asiatic-Pacific Theater.

Construction
Naos was laid down 8 June 1943, under Maritime Commission (MARCOM) contract, MC hull No. 1684, as the Liberty ship SS William R. Nelson, by California Shipbuilding Corporation, Terminal Island, Los Angeles, California; launched 30 June 1943; and sponsored by Miss Barbara Quarg. The ship was delivered to the Navy under bareboat charter 15 July 1943, converted for Navy use by Los Angeles Shipbuilding and Dry Dock Company, San Pedro, California, and commissioned at San Pedro 17 August 1943.

Service history

1943–1944 
Departing San Pedro on 25 August, Naos loaded cargo at San Francisco and made a round trip run to Pearl Harbor and back between 28 August and 25 October. During the next month she was converted for use as a combination troop transport and cargo ship by General Engineering and Drydock Co., San Francisco. She cleared the Golden Gate 10 December, embarked 1,080 troops at Port Hueneme, and sailed for the South Pacific in convoy 12 December.

Naos reached Espiritu Santo, New Hebrides, 3 January 1944, and discharged her troops and supplies. A week later she sailed for Fiji and thus began shuttle duty throughout much of the South Pacific. Troop and cargo runs during the next eight months sent her to numerous American bases scattered from Samoa and the Ellice Islands to New Caledonia and the Solomons. While carrying more than 1,000 troops from Tulagi to New Zealand in mid-March, she was pounded by a severe tropical storm which left her relatively undamaged but damaged her escort, . Naos provided emergency aid before sending the battered escort to New Caledonia.

Maintaining her busy pace of operations, Naos departed Guadalcanal for the Admiralties. She operated out of Manus between 30 September and 25 October, thence sailed the next day to carry troop reinforcements and supplies to the Palaus. She reached Kossol Passage 31 October, and for more than a month she operated in coastal waters off the northern Palaus. Early in December she embarked 1,114 troops and loaded US Army tanks at Anguar and Peleliu before departing in convoy 8 December. Steaming via the Russell Islands, she returned to Nouméa 22 December. Four days later she resumed shuttle runs which continued throughout the South Pacific for the next five months.

1945–1946 
After embarking Seabee units at Nouméa, Naos sailed for Okinawa 15 May 1945. She touched at bases in the Solomons, the Marshalls, and the Western Carolines and finally arrived off Hagushi Beach, Okinawa, 11 July. She completed discharge and reload operations later that month, and on 29 July, she joined a 65-ship convoy bound for the Marianas. Sailing via Saipan, she reached Pearl Harbor 22 August.

Following the Japanese surrender, Naos returned to the western Pacific carrying repatriated prisoners-of-war and military cargo. She arrived Okinawa 2 October; and, after steaming to avoid Typhoon Louise a week later, she embarked 1,040 troops for return to the United States. She sailed 14 October, and arrived San Francisco 5 November. Naos decommissioned there 6 December 1945, and was returned to the War Shipping Administration (WSA) the same day. Her name was struck from the Navy List 3 January 1946.

Fate
Resuming her original name, William R. Nelson, the ship remained in the National Defense Reserve Fleet, Suisun Bay Group, until purchased by Union Minerals and Alloys Corporation, on 30 June 1969, for $41,680.54. She was physically removed from the Reserve Fleet on 18 February 1970.

References

Bibliography 

Online resources

External links
 

Crater-class cargo ships
World War II auxiliary ships of the United States
Ships built in Los Angeles
1943 ships